The Chilliwack Jets are a Junior "B" ice hockey team based in Chilliwack, British Columbia, Canada. They are members of the Harold Brittain Conference of the Pacific Junior Hockey League (PJHL). The Jets play their home games at the Sardis Sports Complex.

History

The team was founded in 1965 in Chilliwack. They were one of the original six teams in the West Coast Junior Hockey League which later became the now known  Pacific Junior Hockey League (PJHL). The Jets won the league championship in 1970.
The league was again revived in 2020 when PJHL announced that it is awarding an expansion franchise to Chilliwack making it the 13th team in the league. The club is owned by Clayton Robinson who is also the head coach and general manager of the team. The team announced Dylan Devers as the first captain for its inaugural 2020-2021 season. However the season was cancelled amid the COVID-19 pandemic. For the 2021-2022 season, the Jets announced Caleb Garet as the team captain.

Season-by-season record

Note: GP = Games played, W = Wins, L = Losses, T = Ties, OT = Overtime Losses, Shootout losses & Ties Pts = Points, GF = Goals for, GA = Goals against

References

External links
Official website of the Pacific Junior Hockey League

Pacific Junior Hockey League teams
Ice hockey teams in British Columbia
Ice hockey clubs established in 1965
1965 establishments in British Columbia